Andrew George Silver (born 13 January 1967 in London, England) is a former international motorcycle speedway rider who represented England at test level. His father is former rider and current speedway promoter Len Silver.

Andrew Silver took his first rides in 1983 at father Len's Rye House circuit, making rapid progress from reserve to heat leader in three years. When Len, decided to sell his interest in the Rockets, son Andrew was widely expected to make the move into top flight British League racing - so it was a shock when he moved across to the Arena Essex Hammers for a reported £9,000. 

Andrew, the hottest property in British Speedway at this time, was an instant sensation during his two years with the club, setting numerous records wherever he rode. 
He was capped by England at senior level, qualified for successive British Finals and set numerous track records wherever he rode. He has a Hammers career average of 10.52. 

Silver also enjoyed considerable individual success during his tenure with the Hammers, winning the prestigious end-of-season National League Riders' Championship in 1987 at Coventry to add to the Grand Slam title he won earlier that year at Oxford. 
In 1988 Andrew moved into top flight racing, signing for British League Swindon. 
His career stuttered from this point on and - despite four seasons in Robins' colours - failed to live up to expectations. He moved to Eastbourne in 1992 - and was joined by his father in 1993 - before calling it a day at the start of the 1994 season. 

Despite reported attempts to lure him out of the saddle - Andrew caused a sensation by almost winning an individual meeting at Arena Essex during a one-off appearance in 1997 - Silver's leathers remained on the hook. He retired from speedway early to take up a post in his father's ski holiday company.

After a long break from the sport, Silver made a successful comeback as a member of the 2009 Rye House Rockets team in the Premier League and scored a six-ride maximum for the Rockets in their victory over Stoke on 2 September 2009. At the end of the 2009 season, Silver retired once again.

References

1967 births
Living people
British speedway riders
English motorcycle racers
Swindon Robins riders
Rye House Rockets riders
Lakeside Hammers riders
Eastbourne Eagles riders
Oxford Cheetahs riders
Cradley Heathens riders